This list of hills in the Teutoburg Forest records a selection of the hills, elevations and foothills (some are only high points on the crest of the ridge) in the Teutoburg Forest and its foothills, a hill chain in the German states of North Rhine-Westphalia and Lower Saxony. Several belong to the Iburg Forest (a hill ridge near Bad Iburg) or the Lippe Forest (Lippischer Wald) (southeastern part of the chain), most however are considered part of the Western Egge Foreland in the transition region to the Egge Hills (Eggegebirge) – a continuation of the hill chain to the southeast.

Most of the hills of in the Teutoburg Forest lie in North Rhine-Westphalia ("NW"), those in Lower Saxony ("NI") and others on the border between the two states are indicated by the relevant abbreviations.
 Barnacken (446.1 m), Horn-Bad Meinberg-Holzhausen; Lippe Forest
 Padberg (437.5 m), Schlangen-Kohlstädt
 Schierenberg (410 m), Schlangen-Kohlstädt
 Mordkopf (408.6 m), Horn-Bad Meinberg-Holzhausen
 Kleiner Rigi (387.7 m), Horn-Bad Meinberg-Holzhausen
 Kartoffelberg (ca. 385 m), Horn-Bad Meinberg-Holzhausen
 Eggeberg (437.0 m), Horn-Bad Meinberg-Veldrom (also: Western Egge Foreland)
 Bielstein (409.0 m), Horn-Bad Meinberg-Veldromand the  nearby Skilift
 Hohlestein (433.2 m), Schlangen-Kohlstädtand the Hohlstein Cave (also: Western Egge Foreland)
 Ebersberg (401 m), Horn-Bad Meinberg-Veldrom
 Markberg (ca. 394 m), Horn-Bad Meinberg-Veldrom
 Upper Langenberg (418.8 m, Horn-Bad Meinberg-Holzhausen; Lippe Forest
 Unterer Langenberg (386 m), Detmold-Berlebeck
 Warmsberg (392.8 m), Detmold-Berlebeck; Lippe Forest
 Stiensberg (ca. 390 m), Detmold-Berlebeck
 Düsterlau (417.4 m), Berlebeck-Johannaberg (Detmold); Lippe Forest
 Kortewebelshals (385.5 m), Johannaberg
 Großer Gauseköterberg (366.7 m), Johannaberg
 Stemberg (401.9 m), Horn-Bad Meinberg-Holzhausenand the nearby ruins of Falkenburg Castle (Detmold); Lippe Forest
 Falkenberg (345.2 m), Horn-Bad Meinberg-Holzhausen
 Bielstein (393.6 m), Detmold-Hiddesenand the Grundnetzsender Teutoburg Forest; Lippe Forest
 Klöppingsberg (393.4 m), Detmold-Heiligenkirchen/Schling
 Kanzel (351 m), Hiddesen
 Uffler (290.9 m), Hiddesenand the  nearby natural monument of Mordkuhle
 Scharfnacken (281.0 m), Hiddesen
 Sternschanze (234.7 m), Hiddesen
 Grotenburg (or: Teutberg; 386 m), Detmold-Hiddesenand Hermann’s Monument and hillfort; Lippe Forest
 Altarstein (ca. 356 m), Hiddesen
 Hellberg (346.8 m), Detmold-Heiligenkirchen/Schling
 Buchenberg (ca. 385 m), Horn-Bad Meinberg-Veldrom (also: Western Egge Foreland)
 Stapelager Berg (365.2 m), Lage-Hörste; Lippe Forest
 Knieberg (365.1 m), Horn-Bad Meinberg
 Hermannsberg (or: Großer Hermannsberg; 363.7 m), Lage-Hörste; Lippe Forest
 Hörster Berg (315,1 m), Hörste
 Esbatzen (278,4 m), Hörste
 Kleiner Ehberg (216.5 m), Detmold-Pivitsheide V. L.
 Großer Ehberg (339.6 m), Detmold-Pivitsheide V. L.
 Allhornberg (316 m), Pivitsheide V. H.
 Tönsberg (336.9 m), Oerlinghausen; Lippe Forestand the Hünenkapelle, Sachsenlager, Löns Monument, memorial to the fallen of the 1st World War, Kumsttonne windmill base.
 Dörenberg (331.2 m), NI, Georgsmarienhütte; Iburg Forestu. a. and the Hermann’s Tower (observation tower), Bennosteinbruch and Bäumker Chapel
 Huneckenkammer (325.7 m), Oerlinghausen; Lippe Forest
 Mämerich (310.2 m), Oerlinghausen
 Ravensberg (304.0 m), Oerlinghausen
 Hohe Warte (325.0 m), Detmold-Berlebeck; Lippe Forest
 Auf dem Polle (320.4 m), Bielefeld-Stieghorst/Lämershagen
 Lewenberg (312.6 m), Lämershagen
 Eisgrundsberg (268.9 m), Bielefeld-Stieghorst/Lämershagen
 Bärenstein (317.6 m), Horn-Bad Meinberg-Holzhausenand the nearby Externsteine
 Hengeberg (315.7 m), Halle/Werther
 Knickenhagen (ca. 314.1 m), Horn-Bad Meinbergand the nearby Externsteine
 Grafensundern (314 m), NI, Bad Iburg; Iburg Forestand the transmitter site
 Hünenberg (312.5 m), between Bielefeld-Quelle and -Uerentrupwith the Bielefeld Hünenburg and Hünenburg Observation Tower
 Jostberg (285.7 m), between Quelle and Uerentrup
 Sennberg (282.2 m), Uerentrup
 Große Egge (312.1 m), Hallewith its  closed microwave tower
 Ebberg (309.5 m), between Bielefeld-Buschkamp and -Hillegossenwith its Bielefeld Bismarck Tower, called the "Iron Anthony" (Eisernem Anton), an observation tower.
 Bokelberg (264.8 m), Buschkamp / Hillegossen
 Jostmeiers Berg (260.5 m), Buschkamp / Hillegossenand the  Zwergen Cave
 Hankenüll (307.1 m), NW / NI, between Borgholzhausen and Dissen
 Ascher Egge (284 m), NI, Dissen
 Steinbrink (ca. 209 m), NI, Dissen
 Hollandskopf (306.6 m), Borgholzhausenand the nature reserve of Johannisegge–Schornstein
 Schornstein (ca. 273 m), Borgholzhausen
 Vicarienkopf (ca. 270 m), Borgholzhausen
 Bußberg (306.2 m), between Bielefeld-Kirchdornberg and Steinhagen-Amshausenand the Schwedenschanze near Dornberg
 Petersberg (266 m), Kirchdornberg / Amshausen
 Rosenberg (301.6 m), Bielefeld-Brackwede
 Palsterkamper Berg (295.1 m), between Bielefeld-Großdornberg and Steinhagen-Rote Erde
 Togdrang (293.8 m), Bielefeld-Sieker and -Buschkamp
 Kettlersche Berge (283.6 m), Sieker and Buschkamp
 Barkhauser Berge (292.6 m), Oerlinghausen
 Johannisegge (293.0 m), Borgholzhausenand the Luise Tower (observation tower)
 Hellegrundsberg (276.0 m), Bielefeld-Stieghorst/Lämershagen
 Menkhauser Berg (ca. 271 m), Oerlinghausen
 Steinbült (261.4 m), between Oerlinghausen and Oerlinghausen-Lipperreiheand the 492-metre-long tunnel of the Landesstraße 751n (Oerlinghausen–Lipperreihe section)
 Barenberg (269.2 m), between Borgholzhausen and Hesselnand nearby Ravensberg Castle
 Großer Freeden (269 m), NI, Bad Iburg
 Kleiner Freeden (200 m), NI, Bad Iburg
 Käseberg (266.9 m), Bielefeld-Brackwede
 Steinegge (ca. 266 m), NI, Dissenand the Fernmeldeturm Dissen (with its observation platform)
 Schollegge (255.4 m), NI, Dissen
 Petersbrink (ca. 212 m), NI, Dissen
 Sahlbrink (ca. 244 m), NI, Dissen
 Rechenberg (ca. 206 m), NI, Dissen
 Steinbrink (ca. 200 m), NI, Dissen
 Ubbedisser Berg (266.0 m), between Bielefeld-Ubbedissen and Oerlinghausen
 Hochholz (264 m), NI, Georgsmarienhütte-Oesede; Iburg Forest
 Gottesberg (ca. 263 m), between Bielefeld-Kirchdornberg and Steinhagen-Amshausen
 Hohnangel (ca. 262 m), NW / NI, between Hilter and Dissen
 Hülsberg (ca. 254 m), NI, Hilter
 Musenberg (ca. 256 m), NI, Georgsmarienhütte-Dröper
 Knüll (253.5 m), Hallewith the nature reserve of Knüll – Storkenberg incl. the Kaffeemühle observation tower and two nearby monuments
 Storkenberg (ca. 234.0 m), Halle
 Timmer Egge (ca. 254 m), NI, Hilter
 Asberg (ca. 244 m), NI, Hilter
 Kahler Berg (248.3 m), between Bielefeld-Bethel and -Uerentrupand the nearby Olderdissen Wildlife Park and Bielefeld Botanical Garden
 Baumannsknollen (245.0 m), NI, Georgsmarienhütte; Iburg Forest
 Lammersbrink (191.9 m), NI, Georgsmarienhütteand the Varusturm
 Hohnsberg (242 m), NI, Bad Iburg
 Westerbecker Berg (235 m), Lienen
 Hüggel (226 m), NI, between Hasbergen, Hagen and Georgsmarienhütte
 Zedling (225.7 m), Detmold-Hiddesen; Lippe Forest
 Kahler Ehberg (224.1 m), Hiddesen
 Kupferberg (197 m), Detmold-Heidenoldendorf
 Beutling (ca. 220 m), Melle-Wellingholzhausenwith the nature reserve of Beutling and observation tower
 Lönkerberg (ca. 220 m), between Bielefeld-Brackwede and Gadderbaum
 Urberg (218.1 m), NI, Bad Iburg
 Hohe Liet (217.5 m), Steinhagen-Amshausen
 Jacobsberg (216.7 m), Steinhagen-Amshausen
 Kleiner Berg (ca. 208 m), NI, between Bad Laer, Bad Rothenfelde and Hilterwith its observation tower
 Leedener Berg (202.4 m), Tecklenburg-Leeden
 Johannisberg (197.0 m), Bielefeld
 Limberg (194.3 m), NI, Bad Iburg(crash site of Zeppelin LZ 7, 1910)
 Dörenther Klippen (159 m), Ibbenbüren
 Hagenberg, NI, (139.2 m), Bad Iburg
 Birgter Berg (131.8 m), Hörstel-Birgte
 Riesenbecker Berg (133.5 m), Hörstel-Riesenbeck
 Lagerberg (128.2 m) Hörstel-Riesenbeck
 Bergeshöveder Berg (118.2 m), Hörstel-Riesenbeck
 Huckberg (95.2 m), Hörstel-Bevergernnorthwestern end of the Teutoburg Forest
 Waldhügel (90.4 m) in Rheine 
 Thieberg (Neuenkirchener Berg; 83.5 m), between Rheine and Neuenkirchen
 Thieberg 68.6 m), Rheinewith its Hünenborg memorial

Details not fully known 
The details of the following hills in the range are not yet complete: 
 Mielberg (251 m), Bielefeld-Dornberg
 Stadtberg, in Rheine

See also
 List of mountains and hills of Lower Saxony
 List of mountains and hills of North Rhine-Westphalia

References 

Borgholzhausen
Teutoburg Forest
!Teutoburg Forest
!Teutoburg Forest
! List of hills in the Teutoburg Forest
!Teutoburg Forest
!Teutoburg Forest